The Prison-Ashram Project, now administered by Human Kindness Foundation, was started in 1973 by Bo and Sita Lozoff, in cooperation with Ram Dass, to encourage convicts to use meditation and other spiritual teachings, turning their prison time into an ashram-like experience. "Ashram" is a Sanskrit word meaning "House of God".

Bo and Sita Lozoff were the directors of Prison-Ashram Project for decades, giving workshops in prisons throughout the world and answering up to 100 letters per day. Bo retired from the project in 2011; Sita now leads the project, along with a board of directors.

The Prison-Ashram Project has a sister project in England, The Prison Phoenix Trust, which offers yoga and meditation to prisoners in the UK and Ireland.

See also 
Prison contemplative programs
Prison reform
 Prison religion
Religion in United States prisons

References

External links 
 Prison-Ashram Project

Religious prison-related organizations
Ram Dass